Donald Buka (August 17, 1920 – July 21, 2009) was an American supporting actor in radio, films, and television from 1943 (Watch on the Rhine) to 1971 when he appeared in A Memory of Two Mondays.

Early years
Buka was born on August 17, 1920, in Cleveland, Ohio. When he was 17 years old, he went to Pittsburgh to study  at Carnegie Tech.

Career
While he was at Carnegie Tech, aged 17, Buka read a scene for Alfred Lunt and Lynn Fontanne in an otherwise-empty theater. They invited him to join their company immediately, and he accepted. He toured with them for three years.

Buka had worked on a film for Howard Hughes for three days when Hughes offered him a seven-year contract and told the screenwriter to expand Buka's part for the scenes that had not yet been filmed. Buka agreed to the contract with the stipulation that he be allowed to act on stage during the nine months of the traditional theatrical season each year. 

After some early experience in the theater, he got his start in mass media by appearing on the CBS radio program Let's Pretend.

He appeared in episodes of Dragnet, Ironside,  Perry Mason and The High Chaparral.

Buka's Broadway debut came in Twelfth Night (1940). He concluded his Broadway career in Design for Living (1984).

Death
Buka died on July 21, 2009, in Reading, Massachusetts.

Filmography

References

External links

 
 
 

American male film actors
American male television actors
20th-century American male actors
Male actors from Cleveland
1920 births
2009 deaths